Torrente 4: Lethal Crisis is a 2011 Spanish black comedy film directed, written, produced by and starring Santiago Segura as the lead character, Spanish cop José Luis Torrente. The film was the fourth in the popular Torrente series (following Torrente 3: El protector) and successful at the box office. The film features Silvia Abril, Kiko Rivera, Tony Leblanc, Enrique Villén, David Muro, Francisco, David Castillo, Yolanda Ramos, Emma Ozores, Kiko Matamoros, David Bisbal, María La Piedra, Yon González, Soledad Mallol, Ana Obregón and Belén Esteban.

Cast 
 Santiago Segura as José Luis Torrente.
 Silvia Abril as Encarni.
 Kiko Rivera as Julio Rinrín.
 Belén Esteban as Rocío.
 Enrique Villén as Ramírez.
 Tony Leblanc as Gregorio Torrente.
 David Muro as Sr. Castaño.
 Francisco as Rocamora.
 David Castillo as Chancletas.
 Yolanda Ramos as Vacambrosia.
 María La Piedra as Mélanie Rocamora.
 Kiko Matamoros as Otxoa.
 Emma Ozores as Ramírez's wife.
 David Bisbal as Joaqui.
 Soledad Mallol as Chancletas' mother.
 Yon González as Peralta.
 David Fernández Ortiz as Father Tobías.
 Ana Obregón as widow.
 María Patiño as TV presenter.
The footballers Cesc Fàbregas, Sergio Ramos, Kun Agüero, Gonzalo Higuaín, Álvaro Arbeloa and Raúl Albiol make cameo appearances. The actors and comedians José Mota, El Gran Wyoming, Andreu Buenafuente, Pablo Motos, Santiago Urrialde, Florentino Fernández, Manuel Barragán, Fernando Esteso, Carlos Areces, Javier Gutiérrez, Sonia Monroy, Ernesto Sevilla, Juanito Navarro, Josemi Rodríguez, Cañita Brava and Xavier Deltell, make a cameo, too. And the Spanish celebrities Carmen Martínez-Bordiú, John Cobra, Carmen de Mairena, Risto Mejide, Joselito, Hombres G and Mari Cielo Pajares also appear in the film.

See also 
 List of Spanish films of 2011

References

External links 
 

2011 films
Films shot in Madrid
2010s Spanish-language films
Spanish 3D films
Madrid in fiction
Andalusia in fiction
Films scored by Roque Baños
Films directed by Santiago Segura
Films about prison escapes
Atresmedia Cine films
2010s Spanish films